(formerly Etsuko Takenaka) is a retired Japanese badminton player noted for her consistency and impassive demeanor, who won numerous international titles during the 1970s. Along with her contemporaries Hiroe Yuki (Niinuma) and Noriko Takagi (Nakayama), she is one of three Japanese women to have won both singles (1970) and doubles (1972, 1973, 1975, 1977) at the prestigious All-England Championships. These three helped Japan to dominate the Uber Cup (women's world team) competition from the mid-1960s to the early 1980s. In 1977 Mrs. Toganoo won the women's doubles with Emiko Ueno at the first IBF World Championships.

References 

Year of birth missing (living people)
Living people
Japanese female badminton players
Asian Games medalists in badminton
Badminton players at the 1970 Asian Games
Badminton players at the 1974 Asian Games
Asian Games gold medalists for Japan
Asian Games bronze medalists for Japan
Medalists at the 1970 Asian Games
Medalists at the 1974 Asian Games